Neutron and Star, also known as Seventh Heaven, is a British trance duo consisting of producer/writer Alan Stott and vocalist/writer Lucy Clarke.

Music videos 
"Neutron and Star - Believe" (Alter Ego Records - AE069 - 2012)
"Neutron and Star - Just Let Go" (Rolling Recordings - 2013)

Discography

Singles 
"Seventh Heaven - Broken"
"Seventh Heaven - Illacrimo"
"Seventh Heaven - Dolphins"
"Mike Koglin vs Seventh Heaven - Sanctuary"
"Mike Koglin vs Seventh Heaven - Calling You"
"Neutron and Star - Lust"
"Neutron and Star - Believe" (Original mix / Mike Koglin remix / Corderoy remix / Natlife remix / Alphadelta remix) (Alter Ego Recordings)
"Neutron and Star - Losing You"
"Neutron and Star - Time" (Original mix / Sunset mix / Corderoy remix / Natlife remix) (True Trance Recordings)
"Neutron and Star - Just Let Go" (Original mix / Sunset mix / Corderoy remix / Natlife remix) (Rolling Recordings)

Remixes 
"Neonate - Pridian (Seventh Heaven remix)"
"Wapskallion feat. Stace - Fine Day (Seventh Heaven remix)"
"Mike Koglin - On My Way (Seventh Heaven remix)"
"Lost Witness - Home (Seventh Heaven remix)"
"Eddie Sender feat. Marcie - Be Free (Seventh Heaven remix)"
"Gouryella - Ligaya (Seventh Heaven remix)"
"Lost Witness - Home (Seventh Heaven's One Step at a Time remix) (ambient remix)"
"The Killers - Mr Brightside (Neutron and Star remix)"
"Cascada - What Do You Want (Neutron and Star remix)"
"Coast 2 Coast - Home (Neutron and Star remix)"
"System F - Solstice (Neutron and Star remix)"
"Armin Van Buuren ft Jan Vayne - Serenity (Neutron and Star remix)"
"Solarstone - Seven Cities (Neutron and Star remix)"
"Conor Maynard - Turn Around (Neutron and Star remix)"

External links 
Neutron and Star on Beatport
Alan J Stott - Discogs
Seventh Heaven - Discogs

Record production duos
2003 establishments in England
Musical groups from London
Musical groups established in 2003